Quando c'era lui... caro lei! (translation: "When he was there ... you dear!") is a 1978 Italian comedy film written and directed by Giancarlo Santi. It is a satirical recount of the Italian fascist era.

Plot 

A limousine stops in front of a petrol station owned by Beretta, which recognizes two of his old friends in the car: the commissioner Pavanati and the Senator Rossetti, once an anarchist. The two invite Beretta to the restaurant, where they will recall their days under fascism.

Cast 

Paolo Villaggio as Beretta
Gianni Cavina as  Pavanati
Hugo Pratt as Rossetti
Maria Grazia Buccella  as Lauretta (Clara Petacci)
Mario Carotenuto as  The Pope
Orietta Berti as  Rachele
 Marcello Bonini  as  Gabriele D'Annunzio
Giuliana Calandra as  Elena of Montenegro
 Eolo Capritti as  Benito Mussolini
 Dante Cleri as  The Mayor
 Salvatore Funari as  Victor Emmanuel III of Italy 
 Gianni Magni as  Sbrodaglio (Pietro Badoglio)
Tiberio Murgia as The Driver
Memè Perlini as  Adolf Hitler
John Stacy as  Lord Chamberlain

References

External links

Italian comedy films
1978 comedy films
1978 films
Films about fascists
Italian satirical films
1970s Italian films